is an uninhabited island in the Pacific Ocean. It is part of the Kerama Islands group in Shimajiri District, Okinawa Prefecture, Japan.

The Kerama Airport is located on Fukaji. There is an observatory for whale watching near the entrance of the airport.

References

Islands of Okinawa Prefecture
Kerama Islands